The High Commission of Singapore in London is the diplomatic mission of Singapore in the United Kingdom. Also accredited as the Embassy of Singapore to Ireland and Iceland.

The building forms one of a group of Grade II listed stucco buildings along the western side of Wilton Crescent, in the Belgravia district.

Gallery

References

External links
Official site

Singapore
Diplomatic missions of Singapore
Singapore–United Kingdom relations
Grade II listed buildings in the City of Westminster
Belgravia